The 2016 Sepang Superbike World Championship round was the sixth round of the 2016 Superbike World Championship. It took place over the weekend of 13–15 May 2016 at the Sepang International Circuit.

Championship standings after the round

Superbike Championship standings after Race 1

Superbike Championship standings after Race 2

Supersport Championship standings

External links
 Superbike Race 1 results
 Superbike Race 2 results
 Supersport Race results

2016 Superbike World Championship season
Superbike World Championship
Sepang Superbike World Championship round